Defending champions Elena Dementieva and Janette Husárová did not compete together. Dementieva and Lina Krasnoroutskaya were third seed, but lost in the first round. Husárová and Patty Schnyder were unseeded; they lost in the second round to fourth seed Nadia Petrova and Meghann Shaughnessy. Petrova and Shaughnessy went on to reach the final, were they defeated the Russian wildcard team Anastasia Myskina and Vera Zvonareva (6–3, 6–4).

Seeds

Draw

Draw

Qualifying

Seeds

Qualifiers
  Maria Kondratieva /  Ekaterina Kozhokina

Qualifying draw

External links
 Kremlin Cup Draw
 ITF tournament profile

Kremlin Cup
Kremlin Cup